Amore Musica is the fourth album by British tenor Russell Watson released in 2004. The album was produced by British record producer, Simon Franglen.

Track listing 
 "Amore E Musica"
 "Magia Sarà"
 "You Raise Me Up"
 "Gladiatore" - based on the film Gladiator
 "I Te Vurria Vasa"
 "I Believe"
 "La Flamma Sacra"
 "You'll Still Be There for Me" - based on the film Rob Roy
 "Alchemist" featuring Lara Fabian
 "Pray For The Love"
 "C'è Sempre Musica"
 "I'll Walk with God" - from The Student Prince
 "We Will Stand Together" - based on Elgar's Nimrod

Charts

References 

Russell Watson albums
2004 albums
Classical crossover albums